Ernst Hess (13 May 1912 – 2 November 1968) was a Swiss conductor, composer and musicologist.

Career
Born in Schaffhausen, Hess studied at the conservatory of Zurich from 1932 and 1934, and then at the Ecole Normale de Musique de Paris, with Paul Dukas and Nadia Boulanger among others. From 1935 he worked in Switzerland as conductor of several choirs and orchestras. In 1938, he was appointed lecturer of music theory at the conservatory of Winterthur. From 1956, he taught musicology at the University of Zurich.

As a composer, he wrote mostly sacred and secular choral music, namely the oratorio Jeremia. He was awarded the composition prize of the Conrad-Ferdinand-Meyer-Stiftung in 1947. In 1966 he received the Hans-Georg-Nägeli-Medaille of Zurich.

Hess died in Egg.

Selected works
 Suite for Guitar Solo (1935); Hug G.H. 11468
 Suite for Viola Solo, Op. 14 (1936)
 Concerto for Viola, Cello and Chamber Orchestra, Op. 20
 Sinfonia academia (Kleine Sinfonia), Op. 22
 Concerto for Horn and Chamber Orchestra, Op. 24
 Concerto for Violin and Orchestra, Op. 27
 Kleine Musik, for basset horn, violin, viola and cello, Op. 29b (Amadeus Verlag BP 543)
 Sinfonia concertante, for violin, piano and orchestra, Op. 55
 Unter Dach und Himmel, three poems by Werner Weber for men's chorus (TTBB), alto solo and piano, Op. 56 (Hug G.H. 10624)
 Capriccio, for trombone and piano, Op. 57 (Helbling Best.-Nr. 10231)
 Concerto da camera, for cello and chamber orchestra, Op. 63
 Wenn im Unendlichen, after Johann Wolfgang Goethe, for mixed choir a cappella (Hug G.H. 10904)
 Schweizergebet, on a text by Rudolf Hägni, for mixed choir and organ ad lib (Hug G.H. 9319)
 Zeitgenössische Orgelmusik im Gottesdienst (contemporary music in the church service) (Edition Eulenburg)

External links 
 
 
 Nachlass von Ernst Hess in der Zentralbibliothek Zürich
 Texthalde: Ernst Hess - Jeremia – Das Werk eines Schweizer Komponisten (in German)

1912 births
1968 deaths
20th-century classical composers
20th-century conductors (music)
20th-century male musicians
20th-century musicologists
École Normale de Musique de Paris alumni
Male conductors (music)
People from Schaffhausen
Swiss classical composers
Swiss conductors (music)
Swiss male classical composers
Swiss musicologists
Academic staff of the University of Zurich
20th-century Swiss composers